Batocera lethuauti is a species of beetle in the family Cerambycidae. It was described by Schmitt and Le Thuaut in 2000. The species lives in Sumba Island.

References

Batocerini
Beetles described in 2000